George Street Bridge, also known as County Bridge No. 159, is a historic Whipple truss bridge located at Aurora, Dearborn County, Indiana. It was built by the Lomas Forge & Bridge Works in 1887.  It traverses Hogan Creek and measures 199 feet, 4 inches, long.  It is one of the oldest iron bridges in Indiana.

It was added to the National Register of Historic Places in 1984.  It is located in the Downtown Aurora Historic District.

References

Truss bridges in the United States
Road bridges on the National Register of Historic Places in Indiana
Bridges completed in 1887
Transportation buildings and structures in Dearborn County, Indiana
National Register of Historic Places in Dearborn County, Indiana
Historic district contributing properties in Indiana
Whipple truss bridges in the United States